Figure skating at the 1997 European Youth Olympic Winter Days were held in Sundsvall, Sweden between February 7 and 12, 1997. Skaters competed in the disciplines of men's singles, ladies' singles, and Ice dancing.

Results

Men

Ladies

Ice dance

External links
 results

European Youth Olympic Festival
Figure skating
Figure skating in Sweden